Rouville is a commune in the Seine-Maritime department in the Normandy region in northern France.

Geography
The A29 autoroute follows the southern border of the commune.

Population

Places of interest
 The church of St. Hermes, with parts dating from the eleventh century.
 The church of St. Pierre, also dating from the eleventh century.
 A seventeenth century manorhouse.
The chapel of Notre Dame at Bielleville.

See also
Communes of the Seine-Maritime department

References

Communes of Seine-Maritime